Englert is a surname. Notable people with the surname include:

Alice Englert (born 1994), Australian actress
Berthold-Georg Englert (born 1953), Provost's Chair Professor at the National University of Singapore
Carrie Englert (born 1957), United States gymnastics champion in floor exercise and balance beam in 1976
François Englert (born 1932), Belgian theoretical physicist and Nobel laureate
J.F. Englert, American fiction novel writer, non-fiction writer, and screenwriter
Jan Englert (born 1943), Polish film actor
Joe Englert (1961–2020), Washington DC area restaurateur
Mark Englert, American musician, guitarist for Dramarama since 1982
Michał Englert (born 1975), Polish cinematographer and screenwriter
Peter Englert, former Chancellor of the University of Hawaiʻi at Mānoa
Sabine Englert (born 1981), German team handball goalkeeper
Sebastian Englert OFM Cap., (1888–1969), Capuchin Franciscan friar, priest, missionary, linguist and ethnologist

See also
Father Sebastian Englert Anthropological Museum, in the town of Hanga Roa on Rapa Nui (Easter Island) in Chilean Polynesia
Englert Theatre in Iowa City, a splendidly renovated vaudeville-era playhouse
Engelbert (disambiguation)
Englebert (disambiguation)
Englehardt (disambiguation)
Englehart
Engleheart
Engler